Syawa is a village located in the mountainous region of Uttarakhand, India.

Population and Demographics 
According to the 2011 census, the village contained a total of 475 people, with 233 (49%) males, and 242 (51%) females. There were 89 children and 386 adults.

Location 
It is nestled in the lower region of the Himalayas.

Syawa is administrated by a Sarpanch, who is the elected representative of the village.

References 

Cities and towns in Uttarkashi district